Phil Healy (born 19 November 1994) is an Irish athlete competing in sprinting events. Her sister Joan Healy is also a sprinter.

She set an Irish 200m national record in July 2018. In the 2018 European Championships, she placed fourth with a time of 23.23.

A video of Phil Healy winning the final leg of the 4 x 400 metre Irish University Championships in 2016 went viral around the world. Her winning run is often cited as one of the greatest athletics comebacks of all time. As she turns into the homestretch, having closed much of an 80-metre gap with the lead runners, the TV commentator is heard to shout "UCC from the depths of hell are powering through".

International competitions

1Did not finish in the final

Personal bests
Outdoor
100 metres – 11.28 (+2.0 m/s, Dublin 2018, National Record - NR) https://www.irishexaminer.com/sport/arid-30847446.html
200 metres – 22.99 (0.0 m/s, Cork 2018, NR)
400 metres – 51.50 (Belfast 2021)
Indoor
60 metres – 7.31 (Athlone 2017)
200 metres – 23.10 (Athlone 2020)
400 metres – 51.94 (Torun 2021)

References

All-Athletics profile

External links
 
 
 
 

1994 births
Living people
Irish female sprinters
Sportspeople from County Cork
Competitors at the 2017 Summer Universiade
Competitors at the 2019 Summer Universiade
Athletes (track and field) at the 2020 Summer Olympics
Olympic athletes of Ireland
Olympic female sprinters